Eric Darrell Young (born November 22, 1983, in Union, South Carolina) is a former American football guard for the San Diego Chargers. He was signed by the Cleveland Browns as an undrafted free agent in 2008. He played college football at the University of Tennessee.

Young has also played for the St. Louis Rams.

Early years
At Union High School, Union SC, Young was All-America by Parade, SuperPrep, CNNSI.com/TheInsiders.com and named First-team on CNNSI.com/BorderWars.com All-South Team . Also he was named First-team offense member of Fox Sports Net All-South Team. Young was a  Two-time All-State selection and had 33 pancake blocks as senior and 183 during career. He ran 4.8 40-yard dash and as a junior, he won state high school shot put competition with toss of 54–6.

College career
In his last two seasons as a starter, Young produced 148 knockdown blocks and he was the 2007 All-American Dream Team selection rated the second-best offensive guard prospect in the country by The NFL Draft Report He started the team's first eight games at left offensive tackle, earning Second-team All-Southeastern Conference honors, despite sitting out the final six contests after suffering a torn quadriceps muscle in his left leg. In 495 offensive snaps, Young registered 58 knockdowns with 11 touchdown-resulting blocks and seven more blocks downfield, leading SEC offensive linemen with an 86.38% grade for blocking consistency. He led an offensive line that allowed only four quarterback sacks for the season. Young has enjoyed a strong senior season at left tackle, and some believe he can remain there in the NFL. At his best as a run blocker, Young uses his hands and quick feet to generate movement at the point of attack. Played both left and right tackle for the Vols, but missed the last six games in '07 because of a torn quad muscle. In 2005, he played  nine games with two starts. In 2004, he played in three games including Cotton Bowl Classic vs. Texas A&M. In 2003, he redshirted.

Professional career

Pre-draft

Cleveland Browns
Young was signed by the Cleveland Browns as an undrafted rookie free agent on May 1, 2008. He was released for after the 2008 season by the Browns.

St. Louis Rams
Young signed with the St. Louis Rams on May 20, 2009. After one game he was released on September 16. He was later signed to the Rams practice squad. On December 16, Young was promoted to the active roster.

San Diego Chargers
Young was signed to a future contract by the San Diego Chargers on January 12, 2011.

References

External links

Cleveland Browns bio
Tennessee Volunteers bio

1983 births
Living people
Players of American football from South Carolina
American football offensive guards
Tennessee Volunteers football players
Cleveland Browns players
St. Louis Rams players